Sir Robert Harley  (baptised 1 March 1579 – 6 November 1656) was an English statesman who served as Master of the Mint for Charles I. A devout Puritan, he supported Parliament in the Wars of the Three Kingdoms.

Life
He was the son of Thomas Harley of Brampton Bryan Castle in Herefordshire and his wife Margaret, daughter of Sir Andrew Corbet. He entered Oriel College, Oxford in 1595, earning a BA in 1599. He entered Middle Temple in 1599. He was invested as a Knight of the Bath on  25 July 1603.  

After his first marriage in 1603, he served in various local offices in Herefordshire and Radnorshire, including representing Radnor in Parliament in 1604, Herefordshire in 1624 and 1626 and Evesham in 1628. In 1623 he had married Brilliana, daughter of Sir Edward Conway, one of the Secretaries of State, and acted as his aide in Parliament. He was rewarded for this by being appointed Master of the Mint.  He was deprived of this office in 1635 but reinstated in 1643.  During this period, his attitude was more that of a country gentleman than of a courtier.

In religion (like Brilliana), Harley was a puritan, taking an anti-Catholic and later also anti-Arminian line.  He was successively elected to both Parliaments in 1640 (Short Parliament  and  Long parliament), where he opposed ship money, Laudian ecclesiastical innovations and the Scottish War. This led him to join the Parliamentary party. Harley was in charge of the Committee for the Demolition of Monuments of Superstition and Idolatry, and presided over the destruction of a great deal of religious art and architecture. 

He was an active member of that party both in Parliament and in Herefordshire, Brampton Bryan Castle undergoing siege in 1643 and 1644.  On 30 September 1642, Parliamentarians led by Harley and Henry Grey, 1st Earl of Stamford occupied Hereford without opposition.  In December, they withdrew to Gloucester because of the presence in the area of a Royalist army under Lord Herbert.

His support for reconciliation with the king led to his being excluded from the House of Commons in Pride's Purge.  He and his son Edward, a colonel in the Parliamentarian army, were imprisoned until after the king's execution.  He resigned as Master of the Mint in May 1649 and took no further part in politics.

He left several sons, his heir Edward being the father of Queen Anne's Lord Treasurer, Robert Harley, who was raised to the peerage as the Earl of Oxford and Earl Mortimer.

References

Sources
 Jacqueline Eales, 'Harley, Sir Robert (1579–1656)' Oxford Dictionary of National Biography, Oxford University Press, 2004 (article 12343).

 
 

1579 births
1656 deaths
People from Herefordshire
Members of the Parliament of England (pre-1707) for constituencies in Wales
Roundheads
Lay members of the Westminster Assembly
Masters of the Mint
Robert
English MPs 1604–1611
English MPs 1624–1625
English MPs 1626
English MPs 1628–1629
English MPs 1640 (April)
English MPs 1640–1648
Knights of the Bath
Alumni of Oriel College, Oxford
Members of the Middle Temple